Karaye Emirates is the Emirate council in Kano State with its headquarters in Karaye town. The current Emir of Karaye is Alhaji Dr. Ibrahim Abubakar II.

History 
Karaye town is the headquarters of the Karaye emirate and is located west of Kano city.  Even before the arrival of Bagauda in 999, Magunguna settled in Karaye. The town of Karaye was founded in 1085. From 1101 to 1793, the kings of Habe ruled Karaye. During the time of the Habe rulers, the Karaye emirate expanded to include the Western and Northern areas of the current Kano State.

Relations with Kano 
When the House of Bagauda was ruling in Kano, they asked for cooperation with their neighbor Karaya Emirate in order to unite their forces in order to protect themselves from other emirates like Zaria, Katsina and Sokoto. Karaye agreed to cooperate with the House of Bagauda where Karaye returned to the Kingdom of Kano. From the time Karaye was under the Kano Kingdom until the arrival of the Fulani Kings after the Usman Dan Fodio's Jihad.

The Current Kingdom of Karaye 
The Karaye Emirates continued to be under the Kindom of Kano until 2020 when the Kano State Government issued five more new emirates and changed the structure of the emirate of Kano. At that time the Kano government brought back the new Emirate of Karaye. The Karaye Emirates consists eight local government areas of Kano State, Karaye, Rogo, Gwarzo, Kabo, Rimin Gado, Madobi, Kiru and Shanono.

References 

Hausa
History of Nigeria
Non-sovereign monarchy